When the Ham Turned is a 1914 American comedy film featuring Oliver Hardy.

Plot

Cast
 Raymond McKee as A. Hamo
 Ed Lawrence as The Mayor
 C.W. Ritchie as Police Chief
 Oliver Hardy as Bartender (as Babe Hardy)

See also
 List of American films of 1914
 Oliver Hardy filmography

External links

1914 films
American silent short films
1914 short films
American black-and-white films
1914 comedy films
Films directed by Frank Griffin
Silent American comedy films
American comedy short films
1910s American films